Gorica (small hill) is Slavic toponym that may refer to :

Settlements

In Albania: 
 Korçë, Горица in Macedonian

In Bosnia and Herzegovina:

Gorica, Čapljina
Gorica, Grude
Gorica, Konjic
Gorica, Prozor
Gorica (Sarajevo), a neighborhood of Sarajevo
Gorica (Zenica), a village in the city of Zenica

In Croatia:
Gorica, settlement of Duga Resa
Gorica, Koprivnica-Križevci County, a village near Rasinja
Gorica, Zadar County, a village near Sukošan
Velika Gorica
Mala Gorica (disambiguation), several places

In Italy:

Gorizia (Gorica)

In Hungary:

Gorica, settlement of Bükkösd since 1979, before was an independent village. The village original name was Erdi in 1542, later the migrated southern-slavs changed to Gorica . In the Ottoman occupation the village destroyed. Only in the 16th century populated with Germans and Hungarians.

In Montenegro:

Gorica, Danilovgrad, a village in the Danilovgrad Municipality

In Serbia:

Gorica (neighborhood), a neighborhood of Sremčica

In Slovenia:

Gorica, Kočevske Poljane, a hamlet of Kočevske Poljane in the Municipality of Kočevske Poljane
Gorica, Puconci, a settlement in the Municipality of Puconci
Gorica pri Dobjem, a settlement in the Municipality of Dobje (known as Gorica until 1953)
Gorica pri Oplotnici, a settlement in the Municipality of Oplotnica
Gorica pri Raztezu, a settlement in the Municipality of Krško (known as Gorica until 1953)
Gorica pri Slivnici, a settlement in the Municipality of Šentjur (known as Gorica until 1953)
Gorica pri Šmartnem, a settlement in the Municipality of Celje (known as Gorica until 1953)
Ivančna Gorica, a settlement and municipality
Nova Gorica, a settlement and municipality
Vinska Gorica, a settlement in the Municipality of Dobrna (known as Gorica until 1953)
Zaloška Gorica, a settlement in the Municipality of Žalec (known as Gorica until 1953)

Uplands
Gorica Hill, the namesake of Podgorica, Montenegro
Gorica Plateau, Slovenia, see Tolmin

Other
HNK Gorica, a Croatian football club
KK Gorica, a Croatian basketball club based in Velika Gorica
ND Gorica, a Slovenian football club
Radio Gorica, Montenegro

See also
Roman Catholic Archdiocese of Gorizia, an archdiocese of the Roman Catholic church in Italy
Gorice (disambiguation)
Hořice (disambiguation), Czech variant of Gorica
Horka (disambiguation), Czech variant of Gorica